The 1999 Karl Schäfer Memorial (also known as the Vienna Cup) took place from October 6 through 9th, 1999. Skaters competed in the disciplines of men's singles, ladies' singles, and ice dancing.

Results

Men

Ladies

Ice dancing

External links
 1999 Karl Schäfer Memorial

Karl Schäfer Memorial
Karl Schafer Memorial, 1999
Karl Schafer Memorial